The Khalistan Referendum is a referendum organized by Sikhs for Justice regarding the potential creation of an independent Sikh state known as Khalistan.

The goal of the campaign is to divide the Indian state of Punjab, which is the only state in the country with a majority of Sikhs, and establish it as an independent nation. The SFJ, which was banned in India in 2019, intends to conduct the referendum in Punjab and major cities worldwide. The Indian government has accused Canada of permitting extremists to carry out activities that are "deeply objectionable" and "politically motivated," which pose a threat to India's integrity. While Canadian authorities have defended the exercise as an exercise of freedom of speech, the Khalistani campaign has become a contentious issue in the relationship between New Delhi and Ottawa. There are numerous cases registered in India against the SFJ and its founder, Gurpatwant Singh Pannun.

References

Khalistan movement